Gora is a rural locality (a village) in Vinogradovsky District, Arkhangelsk Oblast, Russia. The population was 35 as of 2012.

Geography 
Gora is located on the Severnaya Dvina River, 29 km northwest of Bereznik (the district's administrative centre) by road. Shastki is the nearest rural locality.

References 

Rural localities in Vinogradovsky District